Xiaoba Subdistrict is a subdistrict in Shizhong District, Leshan, Sichuan, China. , it has 6 residential communities under its administration.

See also 
 List of township-level divisions of Sichuan

References 

Township-level divisions of Sichuan
Leshan
Subdistricts of the People's Republic of China